Dis is a genus of skippers in the butterfly family Hesperiidae.

References

Natural History Museum Lepidoptera genus database

Hesperiidae genera
Hesperiidae